The Glasgow North Eastern Cup was a senior competition organised by the North Eastern FA in Glasgow, and open to clubs in the East and North End of the city.

1881–82 season

Matches

Semi-final

Final

1881-92 season

1882-83 season

1883-84 season

1884-85 season

1885-86 season

1886-87 season 

Tollcross were awarded the trophy in 1886–87. Cowlairs were supposed to be their opponents in the final, but the team never turned up for the match.

1887-88 season

1888-89 season 

Celtic were presented with the trophy and the accompanying badges on May 31, 1889. A smoking ceremony was held in Campbell's, Dunlop Street.

1889-90 season

1890-91 season 

Holders Celtic chose not to enter the competition in 1890–91 with the inauguration of the Scottish League.

The Scottish FA scheduled the Home Nations match between Scotland and Ireland on the same day as the tournament final. The North Eastern FA felt aggrieved as it would likely result in reduced attendances for both teams on the day.

1891-92 season

1892-93 season

1893-94 season

1894-95 season

Winners

References

External links
 North Eastern Cup at Scottish Football Historical Archive

Football in Glasgow
1
Recurring sporting events disestablished in 1895
Recurring sporting events established in 1881
1895 disestablishments in Scotland
1881 establishments in Scotland